Spellbinder, in comics, may refer to:

Spellbinder (DC Comics), two characters, both of which are foes of Batman
Spellbinders, a Marvel Comics limited series, published in 2005

See also
Spellbinder (disambiguation)